Aldo Agatino Forbice (23 September 1940 – 24 May 2021) was an Italian radio host and journalist. As a radio host he was most well known for hosting the Rai Radio 1 program  from 1994 to 2012. He was also an author of long-form essay novels, poetry compilations, and several fiction books, many of which won literary awards in Italy.

Early life
Forbice was born in Catania in 1940. He joined the newspaper Avanti! in the early 1960s as a writer.

Career

As a radio host
Forbice joined Rai News24 by the late 1960s and was in charge of the work-focused Turno C program by 1970. Then, he joined the parent company TG1 as a regional office coordinator and eventually became director for the TG3 television channel by the 1980s. It was not until 1994 that he would be in charge of another program of his own, titled Zapping, that he would continue to host as a daily show until 2012. In an interview with Il Giornale in October 2012, Forbice described how he had been ousted from his position in Rai News due to conflicts with executives in the company over long-term political statements made on the Zapping program.

As an author
While having written a number of non-fiction books and published poetry compilations, Forbice's first fiction novel was Fuori del coro, released in 2016 and covers the story of a controversial radio host investigating a woman's mysterious suicide. However, the book itself also contains poetry interludes and inserts of an essay format that discuss how the fictional content relates to the non-fictional issues of human rights abuses in the world.

Awards and honors
The special jury award for the 2001 Camaiore Literary Prize in the category of contemporary poetry was given to Forbice for his book Bagnomaria. His other poetry works won a number of awards, including the 2002 Laurentum prize, the 2004 S. Domenico prize, the 2006 Circe-Sabaudia prize, and the 2007 Albatros prize. The Associazione Amici della Musica of Alcamo gave the 2009 International Culture Award to Forbice for his journalism work and focus on helping women and children and speaking out on issues of world hunger, genocide, and other political topics. His first fiction book, Fuori dal Coro, won the 2017 Amerigo delle Quattro libertà prize in fiction.

Personal life
Throughout his life, Forbice worked with the Italian General Confederation of Labour and other trade unions to support their work improvement efforts. He had a long history with the Italian Labour Union and using his press career to promote labor initiatives. He founded the monthly magazine Lavoro e Società (Work and Society) in the 1980s, focused on discussing work issues in politics, society, and international economics. At the same time, he also encouraged artistic and social measures, helping to set up an exhibition to support AIDS initiatives and local community development. Forbice died in Rome on 24 May 2021, aged 80.

Bibliography

References

Italian radio personalities
Italian journalists
1940 births
2021 deaths
People from Catania